Recidivism (from recidive and -ism, from Latin recidivus "recurring", from re- "back" and cado "I fall") is the act of a person repeating an undesirable behavior after they have experienced negative consequences of that behavior. It is also used to refer to the percentage of former prisoners who are rearrested for a similar offense.

The term is frequently used in conjunction with criminal behavior and substance abuse. Recidivism is a synonym for "relapse", which is more commonly used in medicine and in the disease model of addiction.

Norway has one of the lowest recidivism rates in the world at 20%. Prisons in Norway and the Norwegian criminal justice system focus on restorative justice and rehabilitating prisoners rather than punishment.

United States

According to an April 2011 report by the Pew Center on the States, the average national recidivism rate for released prisoners is 43%.

According to the National Institute of Justice, almost 44 percent of the recently released return before the end of their first year out. About 68 percent of 405,000 prisoners released in 30 states in 2005 were arrested for a new crime within three years of their release from prison, and 77 percent were arrested within five years, and by year nine that number reaches 83 percent.

Beginning in the 1990s, the US rate of incarceration increased dramatically, filling prisons to capacity in bad conditions for inmates.  Crime continues inside many prison walls. Gangs exist on the inside, often with tactical decisions made by imprisoned leaders.

While the US justice system has traditionally focused its efforts at the front end of the system, by locking people up, it has not exerted an equal effort at the tail end of the system: decreasing the likelihood of reoffending among formerly incarcerated persons. This is a significant issue because ninety-five percent of prisoners will be released back into the community at some point.

A cost study performed by the Vera Institute of Justice, a non-profit committed to decarceration in the United States, found that the average per-inmate cost of incarceration among the 40 states surveyed was $31,286 per year.

According to a national study published in 2003 by The Urban Institute, within three years almost 7 out of 10 released males will be rearrested and half will be back in prison. The study says this happens due to personal and situation characteristics, including the individual's social environment of peers, family, community, and state-level policies.

There are many other factors in recidivism, such as the individual's circumstances before incarceration, events during their incarceration, and the period after they are released from prison, both immediate and long term.

One of the main reasons why they find themselves back in jail is because it is difficult for the individual to fit back in with 'normal' life.  They have to reestablish ties with their family, return to high-risk places and secure formal identification; they often have a poor work history and now have a criminal record to deal with.  Many prisoners report being anxious about their release; they are excited about how their life will be different "this time" which does not always end up being the case.

Drug-related crime

Of US federal inmates in 2010 about half (51%) were serving time for drug offenses.

It is estimated that three quarters of those returning to prison have a history of substance abuse. Over 70 percent of mentally ill prisoners in the United States also have a substance use disorder. Nevertheless, only 7 to 17 percent of prisoners who meet DSM criteria for a substance use disorder receive treatment.

Persons who are incarcerated or otherwise have compulsory involvement with the criminal justice system show rates of substance abuse and dependence four times higher than those of the general population, yet fewer than 20 percent of federal and state prisoners who meet the pertinent diagnostic criteria receive treatment.

Studies assessing the effectiveness of alcohol/drug treatment have shown that inmates who participate in residential treatment programs while incarcerated have 9 to 18 percent lower recidivism rates and 15 to 35 percent lower drug relapse rates than their counterparts who receive no treatment in prison. Inmates who receive aftercare (treatment continuation upon release) demonstrate an even greater reduction in recidivism rate.

Recidivism rates
The United States Department of Justice tracked the re-arrest, re-conviction, and re-incarceration of former inmates for 3 years after their release from prisons in 15 states in 1994.  Key findings include:
 Released prisoners with the highest rearrest rates were robbers (70.2%), burglars (74.0%), larcenists (74.6%), motor vehicle thieves (78.8%), those in prison for possessing or selling stolen property (77.4%) and those in prison for possessing, using or selling illegal weapons (70.2%).
 Within 3 years, 2.5% of released rapists were arrested for another rape, and 1.2% of those who had served time for homicide were arrested for another homicide.  These are the lowest rates of re-arrest for the same category of crime.
 The 272,111 offenders discharged in 1994 had accumulated 4.1 million arrest charges before their most recent imprisonment and another 744,000 charges within 3 years of release.
The Prison Policy Initiative analyzed the recidivism rates associated with various initial offenses and found that statistically, "people convicted of any violent offense are less likely to be re-arrested in the years after release than those convicted of property, drug, or public order offenses."

The ability of former criminals to achieve social mobility appears to narrow as criminal records become electronically stored and accessible.

An accused's history of convictions are called antecedents, known colloquially as "previous" or "form" in the UK and "priors" in the United States and Australia.

There are organizations that help with the re-integration of ex-detainees into society by helping them obtain work, teaching them various societal skills, and by providing all-around support.

In an effort to be more fair and to avoid adding to already high imprisonment rates in the US, courts across America have started using quantitative risk assessment software when trying to make decisions about releasing people on bail and sentencing, which are based on their history and other attributes.  It analyzed recidivism risk scores calculated by one of the most commonly used tools, the Northpointe COMPAS system, and looked at outcomes over two years, and found that only 61% of those deemed high risk actually committed additional crimes during that period and that African-American defendants were far more likely to be given high scores than white defendants.

The TRACER Act is intended to monitor released terrorists to prevent recidivism. Nevertheless, rates of re-offending for political crimes are much less than for non-political crimes.

African Americans and recidivism

With regard to the United States incarceration rate, African Americans represent only about 13 percent of the United States population, yet account for approximately half the prison population as well as ex-offenders once released from prison.  As compared to whites, African Americans are incarcerated 6.4 times higher for violent offenses, 4.4 times higher for property offenses and 9.4 times higher for drug offenses.

African Americans comprise a majority of the prison reentry population, yet few studies have been aimed at studying recidivism among this population.  Recidivism is highest amongst those under the age of 18 who are male and African American, and African Americans have significantly higher levels of recidivism as compared to whites.

The sheer number of ex-inmates exiting prison into the community is significant, however, chances of recidivism are low for those who avoid contact with the law for at least three years after release.  The communities ex-inmates are released into play a part in their likelihood to re-offend; release of African American ex-inmates into communities with higher levels of racial inequality (i.e. communities where poverty and joblessness affect members of one ethnicity more so than others) has been shown to be correlated with higher rates of recidivism, possibly due to the ex-inmates being "isolated from employers, health care services, and other institutions that can facilitate a law-abiding reentry into society".

Employment and recidivism

Most research regarding recidivism indicates that those ex-inmates that obtain employment after release from prison tend to have lower rates of recidivism.  In one study, it was found that even if marginal employment, especially for ex-inmates over the age of 26, is offered to ex-inmates, those ex-inmates are less likely to commit crime than their counterparts.  Another study found that ex-inmates were less likely to re-offend if they found and maintained stable employment throughout their first year of parole.

African Americans are disproportionately represented in the American prison system, representing approximately half the prison population. Of this population, many enter into the prison system with less than a high school diploma.  The lack of education makes ex-inmates qualify for low-skill, low-wage employment.  In addition to lack of education, many inmates report a difficulty in finding employment prior to incarceration.  If an ex-inmate served a long prison sentence, they have lost an opportunity to gain work experience or network with potential job employers.  Because of this, employers and agencies that assist with employment believe that ex-inmates cannot obtain or maintain employment.

For African American ex-inmates, their race is an added barrier to obtaining employment after release.  According to one study, African Americans are more likely to re-offend because employment opportunities are not as available in the communities they return to in relation to whites.

Education and Recidivism
Education has been shown to reduce recidivism rates. When inmates use educational programs while within incarceration they are roughly 43% less likely to recidivate than those who received no education while incarcerated. Inmates, in regards to partaking in educational programs, can improve cognitive ability, work skills as well as being able to further their education upon release.  Maryland, Minnesota and Ohio were involved in a study pertaining to education and recidivism. The study found that when the participant group of released offenders took educational classes while within the confines of prison, they had lower rates of recidivism as well as higher rates of employment. Moreover, the higher the inmates educational level the lower their odds of recidivating becomes. If an inmate attains a certificate of vocation their rate of recidivism reduces by 14.6%, if they attain a GED their rate of recidivism reduces by 25%, or if they attain an Associates in Arts or Associates in Science their rate of recidivism is reduced by 70%. Tax payers are adversely affected as their tax money goes into the prison system instead of other places of society. Educating inmates is also cost effective. When investing in education, it could drastically reduce incarceration costs. For a one dollar investment in educational programs, there would be a reduction of costs of incarceration by nearly five dollars. Education reduces recidivism rates which can reduce cost of incarceration as well as reduce the number of people who commit crime within the community.

Reducing recidivism among African Americans

A cultural re-grounding of African Americans is important to improve self-esteem and help develop a sense of community.
Culturally specific programs and services that focus on characteristics that include the target population values, beliefs, and styles of problem solving may be beneficial in reducing recidivism among African American inmates; programs involving social skills training and social problem solving could also be effective.

For example, research shows that treatment effectiveness should include cognitive-behavioral and social learning techniques of modeling, role playing, reinforcement, extinction, resource provision, concrete verbal suggestions (symbolic modeling, giving reasons, prompting) and cognitive restructuring; the effectiveness of the intervention incorporates a relapse prevention element.  Relapse prevention is a cognitive-behavioral approach to self-management that focuses on teaching alternate responses to high-risk situations. Research also shows that restorative justice approaches to rehabilitation and reentry coupled with the therapeutic benefits of working with plants, say through urban agriculture, lead to psychosocial healing and reintegration into one's former community.

Several theories suggest that access to low-skill employment among parolees is likely to have favorable outcomes, at least over the short term, by strengthening internal and external social controls that constrain behavior toward legal employment.  Any legal employment upon release from prison may help to tip the balance of economic choice toward not needing to engage in criminal activity. Employment as a turning point enhances attachment and commitment to mainstream individuals and pursuits. From that perspective, ex-inmates are constrained from criminal acts because they are more likely to weigh the risk of severing social ties prior to engaging in illegal behavior and opt to refuse to engage in criminal activity.

In 2015, a bipartisan effort, headed by Koch family foundations and the ACLU, reforms to reduce recidivism rates among low-income minority communities were announced with major support across political ideologies. President Obama has praised these efforts who noted the unity will lead to an improved situation of the prison system.

There is greater indication that education in prison helps prevent reincarceration.

Studies
There have been hundreds of studies on the relationship between correctional interventions and recidivism.  These studies show that a reliance on only supervision and punitive sanctions can actually increase the likelihood of someone reoffending, while well-implemented prison and reentry programs can substantially reduce recidivism. Counties, states, and the federal government will often commission studies on trends in recidivism, in addition to research on the impacts of their programming.

Minnesota
The Minnesota Department of Corrections did a study on criminals who are in prison to see if rehabilitation during incarceration correlates with recidivism or saved the state money.  They used the Minnesota's Challenge Incarceration Program (CIP) which consisted of three phases.  The first was a six-month institutional phase followed by two aftercare phases, each lasting at least six months, for a total of about eighteen months.  The first phase was the "boot camp" phase.  Here, inmates had daily schedules sixteen hours long where they participated in activities and showed discipline.  Some activities in phase one included physical training, manual labor, skills training, drug therapy, and transition planning.  The second and third phases were called "community phases."  In phase two the participants are on intensive supervised release (ISR).  ISR includes being in contact with your supervisor on a daily basis, being a full-time employee, keeping curfew, passing random drug and alcohol tests, and doing community service while continuing to participate completely in the program.  The final phase is phase three.  During this phase one is still on ISR and has to remain in the community while maintaining a full-time job.  They have to continue with community service and their participation in the program.  Once phase three is complete participants have "graduated" CIP.  They are then put on supervision until the end of their sentence.  Inmates who drop out or fail to complete the program are sent back to prison to serve the rest of their sentence. Information was gathered through a quasi experimental design.  This compared the recidivism rates of the CIP participants with a control group.  The findings of the study have shown that the CIP program did not significantly reduce the chances of recidivism.  However, CIP did increase the amount of time before rearrest.  Moreover, CIP early release graduates lower the costs for the state by millions every year.

Kentucky

A study was done by Robert Stanz in Jefferson County, Kentucky, which discussed an alternative to jail time.  The alternative was "home incarceration" in which the defendant would complete his or her time at home instead of in jail. According to the study: "Results show that the majority of offenders do successfully complete the program, but that a majority are also re-arrested within 5 years of completion." In doing this, they added to the rate of recidivism. In doing a study on the results of this program, Stanz considered age, race, neighborhood, and several other aspects.  Most of the defendants who fell under the recidivism category included those who were younger, those who were sentenced for multiple charges, those accruing fewer technical violations, males, and those of African-American descent. In contrast, a study published by the African Journal of Criminology and Justice Studies in 2005 used data from the Louisiana Department of Public Safety and Corrections to examine 2,810 juvenile offenders who were released in the 1999/2000 fiscal year.
The study built a socio-demographic of the offenders who were returned to the correctional system within a year of release. There was no significant difference between black offenders and white offenders. The study concluded that race does not play an important role in juvenile recidivism. The findings ran counter to conventional beliefs on the subject, which may not have controlled for other variables.

Methadone maintenance therapy (MMT)

A study was conducted regarding the recidivism rate of inmates receiving MMT (Methadone Maintenance Therapy).  This therapy is intended to wean heroin users from the drug by administering small doses of methadone, thereby avoiding withdrawal symptoms. 589 inmates who took part in MMT programs between 22 November 2005 and 31 October 2006 were observed after their release. Among these former inmates, "there was no statistically significant effect of receiving methadone in the jail or dosage on subsequent recidivism risks".

United States, nationwide

Male prisoners are exposed and subject to sexual and physical violence in prisons.  When these events occur, the victim usually suffers emotionally and physically. Studies suggest that this leads the inmate to accept these types of behaviors and value their lives and the lives of others less when they are released.  These dehumanizing acts, combined with learned violent behavior, are implicated in higher recidivism rates. Two studies were done to attempt to provide a "national" recidivism rate for the US.  One was done in 1983 which included 108,580 state prisoners from 11 different states.  The other study was done in 1994 on 272,111 prisoners from 15 states.  Both studies represent two-thirds of the overall prisoners released in their corresponding years. An image developed by Matt Kelley indicates the percent of parolees returning to prison in each state in 2006.  According to this image, in 2006, there was more recidivism in the southern states, particularly in the Midwestern region.  However, for the majority, the data is spread out throughout the regions.

Rikers Island, New York, New York
The recidivism rate in the New York City jail system is as high as 65%.  The jail at Rikers Island, in New York, is making efforts to reduce this statistic by teaching horticulture to its inmates.  It is shown that the inmates that go through this type of rehabilitation have significantly lower rates of recidivism.

Arizona and Nevada
A study by the University of Nevada, Reno on recidivism rates across the United States showed that, at only 24.6 percent, Arizona has the lowest rate of recidivism among offenders compared to all other US states. Nevada has one of the lowest rates of recidivism among offenders at only 29.2 percent.

California
The recidivism rate in California as of 2008–2009 is 61%. Recidivism has reduced slightly in California from the years of 2002 to 2009 by 5.2%. However, California still has one of the highest recidivism rates in the nation. This high recidivism rate contributes greatly to the overcrowding of jails and prisons in California.

Connecticut
A study conducted in Connecticut followed 16,486 prisoners for a three-year period to see how many of them would end up going back to jail. Results from the study found that about 63% of offenders were rearrested for a new crime and sent to prison again within the first three years they were released.  Of the 16,486 prisoners, about 56% of them were convicted of a new crime.

Florida
In 2001, the Florida Department of Corrections created a graph showing the general recidivism rate of all offenders released from prison from July 1993 until six and a half years later.  This graph shows that recidivism is much more likely within the first six months after they are released.  The longer the offenders stayed out of prison, the less likely they were to return.

Causes
A 2011 study found that harsh prison conditions, including isolation, tended to increase recidivism, though none of these effects were statistically significant. Various researchers have noted that prisoners are stripped of civil rights and are reluctantly absorbed into communities – which further increases their alienation and isolation. Other contributors to recidivism include the difficulties released offenders face in finding jobs, in renting apartments or in getting education. Owners of businesses will often refuse to hire a convicted felon and are at best hesitant, especially when filling any position that entails even minor responsibility or the handling of money (this includes most work), especially to those convicted of thievery, such as larceny, or to drug addicts.  Many leasing corporations (those organisations and people who own and rent apartments)  routinely perform criminal background checks and disqualify ex-convicts.  However, especially in the inner city or in areas with high crime rates, lessors may not always apply their official policies in this regard. When they do, apartments may be rented by someone other than the occupant. People with criminal records report difficulty or inability to find educational opportunities, and are often denied financial aid based on their records. In the United States of America, those found guilty of even a minor misdemeanor (in some states, a citation offense, such as a traffic ticket) or misdemeanour drug offence (e.g. possession of marijuana or heroin) while receiving Federal student aid are disqualified from receiving further aid for a specified period of time.

Policies addressing recidivism 
Countless policies aim to ameliorate recidivism, but many involve a complete overhaul of societal values concerning justice, punishment, and second chances. Other proposals have little impact due to cost and resource issues and other constraints. Plausible approaches include:

 allowing current trends to continue without additional intervention (maintaining the status-quo)
 increasing the presence and quality of pre-release services (within incarceration facilities) that address factors associated with (for example) drug-related criminality—addiction treatment and mental-health counseling and education programs/vocational training
 increasing the presence and quality of community-based organizations that provide post-release/reentry services (in the same areas mentioned in approach 2)

The current criminal-justice system focuses on the front end (arrest and incarceration), and largely ignores the tail-end (and preparation for the tail-end), which includes rehabilitation and re-entry into the community.  In most correctional facilities, if planning for re-entry takes place at all, it only begins a few weeks or months before the release of an inmate.  "This process is often referred to as release planning or transition planning and its parameters may be largely limited to helping a person identify a place to stay upon release and, possibly, a source of income." A judge in Missouri, David Mason, believes the Transcendental Meditation program is a successful tool for rehabilitation. Mason and four other Missouri state and federal judges have sentenced offenders to learn the Transcendental Meditation program as an anti-recidivism modality.

Mental disorders
Psychopaths may have a markedly distorted sense of the potential consequences of their actions, not only for others, but also for themselves. They do not, for example, deeply recognize the risk of being caught, disbelieved or injured as a result of their behaviour. However, numerous studies and recent large-scale meta-analysis cast serious doubt on claims made about the ability of psychopathy ratings to predict who will offend or respond to treatment.

In 2002, Carmel stated that the term recidivism is often used in the psychiatric and mental health literature to mean "rehospitalization", which is problematic because the concept of recidivism generally refers to criminal reoffense. Carmel reviewed the medical literature for articles with recidivism (vs. terms like rehospitalization) in the title and found that articles in the psychiatric literature were more likely to use the term recidivism with its criminological connotation than articles in the rest of medicine, which avoided the term. Carmel suggested that "as a means of decreasing stigmatization of psychiatric patients, we should avoid the word 'recidivism' when what we mean is 'rehospitalization. A 2016 followup by Peirson argued that "public policy makers and leaders should be careful to not misuse the word and unwittingly stigmatize persons with mental illness and substance use disorders".

Law and economics 
The law and economics literature has provided various justifications for the fact that the sanction imposed on an offender depends on whether he was convicted previously. In particular, some authors such as Rubinstein (1980) and Polinsky and Rubinfeld (1991) have argued that a record of prior offenses provides information about the offender's characteristics (e.g., a higher-than-average propensity to commit crimes). However, Shavell (2004) has pointed out that making sanctions depend on offense history may be advantageous even when there are no characteristics to be learned about. In particular, Shavell (2004, p. 529) argues that when "detection of a violation implies not only an immediate sanction, but also a higher sanction for a future violation, an individual will be deterred more from committing a violation presently". Building on Shavell's (2004) insights, Müller and Schmitz (2015) show that it may actually be optimal to further amplify the overdeterrence of repeat offenders when exogenous restrictions on penalties for first-time offenders are relaxed.

See also 

 Bastøy Prison
 Habitual offender
 Incapacitation (penology)
 Incarceration
 Incarceration in Norway
 Serial killer
 Serial offender hunting patterns
 Addiction

References

External links

 Higher Education in Prison at Hudson link 
 Recidivism in Finland 1993–2001
 United States Recidivism Statistics
 Prisoner Recidivism Bureau of Justice Statistics
 recidivism.com Curated articles and data

Criminology
Psychopathy
Penology

fr:Récidive (droit français)